The Porthmadog cross town link is a section of the  narrow gauge Welsh Highland Railway, specifically built to link with the Ffestiniog Railway in Porthmadog, and runs along partly what was called the Junction Railway, previously existing as part of the original Welsh Highland Railway. This had been removed some time after that railway closed in 1936.

The route is as follows:

 Junction with the Ffestiniog Railway at Harbour station.
 Cross Porthmadog High St and the River Glaslyn across the Britannia Bridge with road traffic stopped by lights when trains pass.
 Around the back of the Wilko supermarket. As such this is a deviation from the original line, that broadly speaking went in front of what is now the supermarket.
 Across the back streets, in front of the old mill.
 Across the standard gauge Cambrian Line on the level. This is the only mixed gauge flat rail crossing in the United Kingdom.
 Along the track bed of the Welsh Highland Railway.

For reference, the Junction Railway was empowered to run:

 Junction with the Ffestiniog Railway at Harbour Station.
 Cross Porthmadog High St and the River Glaslyn across the Britannia Bridge with street running.
 a short small curve onto Madoc Street to join to the existing Croesor Tramway line which was taken over by the Welsh Highland Railway.

References

External links 

Ffestiniog Railway
Welsh Highland Railway
Street running
1 ft 11½ in gauge railways in Wales
Porthmadog